The surname Benda may refer to:

A prominent family of musicians originally from Bohemia, chiefly
  (1686–1757), weaver, musician; married Dorota Brixi (1686–1762) of the noted musical family
 Franz Benda (Czech: František Benda; 1709–1786), violin virtuoso and composer
 Maria Carolina Benda (1742–1820), singer, pianist, composer; married German composer Ernst Wilhelm Wolf (1735–1792)
 Friedrich Wilhelm Heinrich Benda (1745–1814), violinist, pianist, composer (known for the Singspiel "Das Blumenmädchen"), born in Potsdam
 Karl Hermann Heinrich Benda (1748–1836), violinist, composer
 August Wilhelm Heinrich Ferdinand (1779–1861), Kammerdiener and nobleman
 , politician
 Hans Robert Heinrich von Benda (1856–1919)
  (1888–1972), conductor
 Friedrich August Benda (1786–1854), civil servant and patron of music
 Juliane Benda (1752–1783), singer, pianist, composer; married writer and composer Johann Friedrich Reichardt (1752–1815)
 Louise Reichardt (1779–1826), German songwriter and composer
 Johann Georg Benda (Czech: Jan Jiří Benda; 1713–1752), violinist, composer
 Viktor Benda (1719–1762), weaver
 Georg Anton Benda (Czech: Jiří Antonín Benda; 1722–1795), kapellmeister, violinist, composer
 Friedrich Ludwig Benda (1746–1792), composer, violinist; married singer 
  (1754–?), violinist
  (1757–?), singer in Hamburg; married actors 1.  2. Adolph Blanchard
  (1779–?), singer and actor; married actor Maximilian Scholz
  (1759–1805), singer, actor
  (1795–1846), actor; married actor Carl August Schmidt
  (1825–?), opera singer; married actor and singer 
 Josephina Maria Louise Benda-Baranyai (born 1854)
  (1884–?), German-American author and journalist
  (1764–1824), singer, actor in Berlin
  (1787–1844), singer and actor
 Joseph Benda (Czech: Josef Benda; 1724–1804), violinist, composer
 Johann Friedrich Ernst Benda (1749–1785), violinist, harpsichordist in Berlin
 Johann Wilhelm Otto Benda (1775–1832), poet and translator
 Karl Friedrich Franz Benda (1754–1816), musician
  (1728–1781), operatic soprano; married Bohemian composer Dismas Hataš (1724–1777)
 Jindřich Krištof Hataš (1739–1808), composer

Unrelated musician
 Felix Benda (1708–1768), Bohemian composer

Other people named Benda
 Adolf Benda (1845–1878), Bohemian regional historian and jewelry craftsman
 Alice Bendová, Czech actress and model
 Andrej Benda, Slovak bobsledder
 Antal Benda (1910–1997), Hungarian field handball player
 Arthur Benda (1885-1969), German photographer
 Břetislav Benda (1897–1983), Czech sculptor
 Christian Benda, Czech cellist, composer, and conductor
 Madame D'Ora-Benda (1881–1963), or Dora Kallmus, photographer
 Ernst Benda (1925–2009), German politician and jurist
 Hans von Benda (1888–1972), German conductor
 Jan Benda (born 1972, Reef, Belgium), Czech-German ice hockey player
 Jan Benda (artist) (1897–1967), a Czech artist
  (1874–1949), a German violinist
 John Benda (born 1947), American professional golfer playing on the European Seniors Tour
 Julien Benda (1867–1956), Jewish French philosopher and novelist
 Marek Benda, Czech politician
 Nancy Tribble Benda (1930 - 2015), actress and educator
 Petr Benda, Czech basketball player
  (1926–2003), a Swiss pianist and composer
 Václav Benda (1946–1999), Czech political activist and mathematician
 Władysław Teodor "W.T." Benda (1873–1948), Polish-American painter and illustrator

Czech-language surnames